Ruben Holsæter (born 20 April 1991) is a Norwegian football midfielder.

He has played his entire career for Førde IL, except from a spell in Jølster IL in 2009 and the period mid-2011 to 2016 when he played for Sogndal. Holsæter got 93 Sogndal games and 6 goals across all competitions, among those 73 Eliteserien games and 2 goals.

References

1991 births
Living people
Norwegian footballers
People from Førde
Sogndal Fotball players
Eliteserien players
Norwegian First Division players
Association football midfielders
Sportspeople from Vestland